Buttrio is a comune (municipality) in   the Italian region Friuli-Venezia Giulia, with a population of 4,050 people, located about  northwest of Trieste and about  southeast of Udine.

Buttrio borders the following municipalities: Manzano, Pavia di Udine, Pradamano, Premariacco.

Buttrio is renowned for its wines, as well as for being the place for the headquarters of the multinational company Danieli SpA, the largest supplier of equipment and plants to the metal industry in the world, are located in Buttrio.

People
Andrea Comparetti, physician and scientist
Marco Racaniello, pianist and composer
Giulio Tami, filmmaker, cinematographer,  and editor

Twin towns
 Nötsch im Gailtal, Austria

References

External links
 Official website

Cities and towns in Friuli-Venezia Giulia